Richard Elmhirst (18 September 1803 – 18 November 1859) was an English first-class cricketer. He is recorded as a batsman in one match for Cambridge University in 1822, when he scored one run.

Elmhirst was educated at Doncaster School (now Hall Cross Academy) and Caius College, Cambridge. After graduating he became a physician at Lincoln.

References

1803 births
1859 deaths
Alumni of Gonville and Caius College, Cambridge
English cricketers of 1787 to 1825
Cambridge University cricketers
19th-century English medical doctors